The Americas Region Caribbean Ring System (ARCOS-1) is a fiber optic submarine communications cable of 8,400 kilometers that extends between the United States, the Bahamas, the Turks and Caicos Islands, the Dominican Republic, Puerto Rico, Curaçao, Venezuela, Colombia, Panama, Costa Rica, Nicaragua, Honduras, Guatemala, Belize, and Mexico. Because of its length, it was divided in two phases: Phase 1 being in service since September 2001 and Phase II since March 2002. The cable system was set in a ring configuration and is operated on a non-common carrier basis.

Carriers (incomplete)
 Columbus Networks (Formerly- New World Network)
 Telecomunicaciones Ultramarinas de Puerto Rico (TUPR or ULTRACOM)

Landing points

 North Miami Beach, Florida, U.S.
 Cancún, Mexico
 Tulum, Mexico
 Ladyville, Belize
 Puerto Barrios, Guatemala
 Puerto Cortés, Honduras
 Trujillo, Honduras
 Puerto Lempira, Honduras
 Puerto Cabezas, Nicaragua
 Bluefields, Nicaragua
 Puerto Limón, Costa Rica
 Maria Chiquita, Panama
 Ustupo, Panama
 Cartagena, Colombia
 Riohacha, Colombia
 Punto Fijo, Venezuela
 Willemstad, Curaçao
 San Juan, Puerto Rico
 Punta Cana, Dominican Republic
 Puerto Plata, Dominican Republic
 Providenciales, Turks and Caicos Islands
 Crooked Island, Bahamas
 Cat Island, Bahamas
 Nassau, Bahamas

See also
ECFS (cable system)

External links
 
 ARCOS-1 Cable Landing License as adopted by the Federal Communications Commission
 ARCOS-1 Transfer of Control (PDF) as adopted by the Federal Communications Commission

Liberty Latin America
Submarine communications cables in the Caribbean Sea
Wide area networks
2001 establishments in North America